In mathematics, the continuous big q-Hermite polynomials  are a family of basic hypergeometric orthogonal polynomials in the basic Askey scheme.  give a detailed list of their properties.

Definition

The  polynomials are given in terms of basic hypergeometric functions.

References

Orthogonal polynomials
Q-analogs
Special hypergeometric functions